The Werq the World tour is an ongoing tour featuring drag queens from RuPaul's Drag Race. The tour, created by Brandon Voss and some input by Shangela, is produced by Voss Events in collaboration with VH1 and World of Wonder. It is known for its large-scale shows on stages with jumbotron screens, which give performances a concert-style feel.

History

Werq the World was forced to reschedule its October 2017 stop in Houston due to the devastation caused by Hurricane Harvey. The tour returned to that city on February 7, 2018, with the queens making a donation to the Montrose Center's LGBTQ Hurricane Harvey Relief Fund. The donation was matched by Voss Events.

In May 2019, World of Wonder debuted Werq the World, a 10-episode docuseries directed by Jasper Rischen. It presents behind-the-scenes looks at the lives of the performers who were on the 2018 European leg of the tour, with each episode profiling a different queen. A second season of the docuseries started streaming in June 2020.

The spring 2020 European leg of Werq the World was rescheduled for spring 2022 due to the COVID-19 pandemic.

On December 20, 2022, the dates for the Europe leg in 2023 were announced. Starting from October 27 to November 14. On March 6, 2023, the rest of the dates were announced for the 2023 leg of the tour.

Tour dates

References

External links

 Werq the World at Voss Events

Drag events
RuPaul's Drag Race